JSGF stands for Java Speech Grammar Format or the JSpeech Grammar Format (in a W3C Note). Developed by Sun Microsystems, it is a textual representation of grammars for use in speech recognition for technologies like XHTML+Voice. JSGF adopts the style and conventions of the Java programming language in addition to use of traditional grammar notations.

The Speech Recognition Grammar Specification was derived from this specification.

Example

The following JSGF grammar will recognize the words coffee, tea, and milk.
#JSGF V1.0;
   
grammar numbers;
    
public <drinks> = coffee | tea | milk;

See also
 SRGS
 XHTML+Voice

External links 
 JSpeech Grammar Format (W3C Note)
 Interactive JSGF Generator

Speech recognition